Saraswati River is a river in western India in Gujarat whose origin is aravali hill. Its basin has a maximum length of 360 km. The Mokeshwar or Mukteshwar dam is on the Saraswati River.

Patan and Siddhpur are located on the banks of Saraswati River.

References

Rivers of Gujarat
Rivers of India